Laleh Dan (also Romanized as Lāleh Dān) is a village in Kharqan Rural District, in the Central District of Razan County, Hamadan Province, Iran. At the 2006 census, its population was 363, in 89 families.

References 

Populated places in Razan County